The fourth season of the Russian reality talent show The Voice Kids premiered on 17 February 2017 on Channel One. Dmitry Nagiev returns as the show's presenter. Dima Bilan returns as coach. Nyusha and Valery Meladze replaced Pelageya and Leonid Agutin as coaches.
Elizaveta Kachurak was announced as the winner of the season, marking Dima Bilan's second win as a coach, and making her the second stolen artist (in Live Playoffs) to win, following Sabina Mustaeva in season 2.

Coaches and presenters

There are two changes to the coaching panel from season three. Coach Dima Bilan is joined by Nyusha and Valery Meladze, who replaced Pelageya and Leonid Agutin.

Also there is a change to the presenters panel from season three. Presenter Dmitry Nagiev is joined by Svetlana Zeinalova, who replaced Valeria Lanskaya.

Teams 
 Colour key

Blind auditions 
Colour key

Episode 1 (17 February)
The coaches performed "Sing" at the start of the show.

Episode 2 (22 February)

Episode 3 (3 March)

Episode 4 (11 March)

Episode 5 (17 March)

Episode 6 (24 March)

The Battles
The Battles round started with the first half of episode 7 and ended with the first half of episode 9 (broadcast on 31 March 2017; on 7, 14 April 2017). 
Contestants who win their battle will advance to the Sing-off rounds.
Color key

The Sing-offs
The Sing-offs round started with the second half of episode 7 and ended with the second half of episode 9 (broadcast on 31 March 2017; on 7, 14 April 2017). 
Contestants who was saved by their coaches will advance to the Final.
Color key

Live shows
Colour key:

Week 1: Live Playoffs (21 April)
As with Season 2, each coach brought back three artists who was eliminated in the Sing-offs.
Playoff results was voted on in real time. Nine artists sang live and six was eliminated by the end of the night.
Three saved artists advanced to the Final.

Week 2: Final (April 28)

Reception

Ratings

References

4
2017 Russian television seasons